Wilcahuaín, Willcahuaín, or Huilcahuaín is an archaeological site in Peru.

Wilcahuaín is regarded as one of the most important archaeological sites of the Wari culture. It was possibly built ca. 1100 AD.

Etymology 
Wilcahuaín possibly comes from Quechua willka grandchild; great-grandson; minor god; holy; sacred or Anadenanthera colubrina (a tree), and Ancash Quechua wayi house.

References 

Archaeological sites in Peru
Archaeological sites in Ancash Region
Wari culture